The English River is a tributary of the Iowa River in southeastern Iowa in the United States. Via the Iowa River, it is part of the Mississippi River watershed. The Deep River is a minor tributary of the English River. The towns of North English, South English and Deep River are named for the English and Deep rivers.

Course
The English River flows for much of its course in north and south forks, which join in extreme northwestern Washington County.

North English River
The  North English River is the longer of the two forks.  It rises just south of Grinnell in western Poweshiek County and flows generally east-southeastwardly through Iowa County, past the town of Guernsey.  In Iowa County it collects two minor tributaries, the Deep River and the Middle English River, both of which rise in Poweshiek County and flow eastwardly for short distances.

Deep River
The Deep River is a minor tributary of the North English River. The stream was reportedly named not because the water was so deep, but rather it was so far down from the stream bank to the water.

The river experienced a record flood on May 14, 1970 with a  greater than 50 year recurrence interval.

Middle English River
The Middle English River, also the Middle Fork English River, is a minor tributary of the North English River.

South English River
The  South English River rises just south of Montezuma in southern Poweshiek County and flows generally eastwardly through extreme northeastern Mahaska County and northern Keokuk County.

See also
List of Iowa rivers

References
Notes

General references
Columbia Gazetteer of North America entry
DeLorme (1998).  Iowa Atlas & Gazetteer.  Yarmouth, Maine: DeLorme.  .

Rivers of Iowa
Rivers of Iowa County, Iowa
Rivers of Keokuk County, Iowa
Rivers of Mahaska County, Iowa
Rivers of Poweshiek County, Iowa
Rivers of Washington County, Iowa